The 2016–17 season was Everton's 63rd consecutive season in the top flight of English football and their 139th year in existence. They participated in the Premier League, FA Cup, League Cup and League Trophy. The season covered the period from 1 July 2016 to 30 June 2017.

Players

First team

Everton announced their squad numbers for the 2016–17 Premier League on 3 August 2016.

Player awards 
 Player of the Season – Romelu Lukaku
 Players' Player of the Season – Romelu Lukaku
 Young Player of the Season – Tom Davies
 Reserve / U21 Player of the Season – Jonjoe Kenny
 Goal of the Season – Tom Davies vs. Manchester City

Transfers

Transfers in

Total spending: £73,950,000

Transfers out

Total incoming: £55,000,000

Loans in

Loans out

Competitions

Pre-season and friendlies

Premier League

League table

Results by matchday

Matches

FA Cup

EFL Cup

Statistics

|}

References

Everton
Everton F.C. seasons